Jake Red Cloud, seen first in Red Cloud Comics, has been a fictional character since 2012.

He is best known as the Red Cloud Comics superhero associated with the film Red Cloud: Deliverance. Jake Red Cloud first appeared in Red Cloud Comics #1 (July 2012) where Jake Red Cloud is on a covert wetworks operation in Malaysia to kill a child trafficking kingpin and rescue imprisoned children.

A Native American of Quechua and Lakota Ancestry, Jake Red Cloud possesses mutant superhuman strength and speed, accelerated healing factor, resilient tissue and bones, clairvoyance, clairaudience, and ability to channel the powers of his totem animals. The comic tells the exploits of Jake Red Cloud as he uses his spirituality and ascended form to guide him through vicious crime rings and help guide innocent children to safety.

Fictional character biography
Jake Red Cloud was born in Pine Ridge, South Dakota, to a Quechua father and a Lakota mother. Jake's father took on the Red Cloud name as a translation from his Quechua name and in honor of his wife's family and their great warrior traditions. Jake was brought up in an isolated and rural part of the reservation. They had very little money even for the necessities. Growing up on the reservation the conditions were substandard, and only the strong survived. On the reservation there was much buried ordnance and hazardous materials from closed US nuclear bomb ranges on the reservation. Being constantly exposed to these materials residents either became very sick with high levels of cancers, or showed genetic mutations which were difficult to explain. Jake early on showed an amazing resiliency to physical harm along with a sixth sense about events before they would occur. When Jake reached age he entered into the US Army where he served for several years in an Airborne Ranger unit before qualifying for Special Forces selection. After doing several tours as a Delta Force operator he decided to retire so he could go back to the reservation and help take care of his parents there.

Film
He was portrayed by Alex Kruz in Red Cloud: Deliverance.

References

External links

Comics characters who can move at superhuman speeds
Comics characters with accelerated healing
Comics characters with superhuman strength
Comics characters introduced in 2011
Fictional Lakota people
Fictional indigenous people of the Americas
Fictional South American people
Fictional characters from South Dakota
Fictional United States Army Delta Force personnel
Fictional United States Army Special Forces personnel
Fictional United States Army Rangers personnel
Comics superheroes